Kurdification is a cultural change in which people, territory, or language become Kurdish. This can happen both naturally (as in Turkish Kurdistan) or as a deliberate government policy (as in Iraq after the 2003 invasion or in Syria after Syrian civil war).

The notion of Kurdification is different from country to country. In Turkish Kurdistan, many ethnic Armenians, Bulgarians, Circassians, Chechens, Ingushs, and Ossetians have become Kurdified as a result of fleeing to the region and having subsequently assimilated to the Kurdish culture and language.

In Iraqi Kurdistan, territories belonging to minorities such as Turkmens and Assyrians were subjected to Kurdification policies until 2017 in the disputed territories of northern Iraq, when the Kurdistan Regional Government administered the area.

Turkey

Turkmen tribes
Throughout history, many Turkic tribes either settled or were forced to settle in Kurdish-inhabited areas. In an interview from 1996, Kurdish writer Yaşar Kemal described his visit to a large Afshar Turkmen village in Diyarbakır. There were overall 8 such villages which also didn't know any Kurdish and were exiled to the region after the Kozanoğlu rebellion in 1865. As historically 30 thousand tents were exiled to the region, Kemal asked the elders why they were only 8 villages. The elders responded that the rest got Kurdified, because they were Sunnis, while these last 8 villages were Alevis and didn't interact with the Sunni Kurds.

Caucasian refugees (1860s–1910s)

When refugees from Caucasus reached the Ottoman Empire, Constantinople decided not to settle these in Kurdistan due to the extreme poverty and lack of material resources for the refugees. Yet after some time, the Ottomans started seeing the refugees as a chance to diminish the Kurdish claim to the region and allowed the refugees to settle in the region. In 1862, Circassian refugees from the Shapsug tribe arrived in the Kurdish areas of Ahlat and Adilcevaz and settled in the three Kurdish villages of Yoğurtyemez, Xanik (Çukurtarla), Develik and founded the village of Koxiş (Yolçatı).

The first big wave of Caucasian refugees to Kurdistan was in 1864 when 15,000 to 20,000 refugees settled in Sarıkamış, founding new villages and settling in abandoned Greek and Armenian villages. The largest group of refugees were Circassias who fled the Circassia region (part of the Russian Empire) during the ethnic cleansing of Circassians. Concurrently with the Circassian migration, Ossetians settled in the villages of Xulik (Otluyazı) and Ağcaviran (Akçaören) in Ahlat. According to the Russian intelligence officer Aleksandr Kolyubakin, no less than 1,500 Ossetians lived in the Sanjak of Muş in the late 1880s.

Chechens and Ingushs mostly settled in Varto area, in the villages of Arincik (Kıyıbaşı),  Çarbuhur (Bağiçi), Tepeköy, Artet (Serinova), Ulusırt and Arinç (Çöğürlü).

From early stage on, these Caucasians went through a process of Kurdification and thereby had Kurdish as their mother tongue.

Urbanization of Kurds
With the departure of non-Muslim populations of many cities in regions with significant Kurdish population, the native urban Muslim populations also migrated to cities such as Gaziantep, İzmir, Adana, Ankara, and Istanbul. The tractorization in rural Kurdish communities during the 1950s and the later abandonment of villages due to the Kurdish-Turkish conflict caused many Kurds to migrate to nearby cities that were losing their native population such as Diyarbakır but also to distant cities like Mersin, either mostly or partially Kurdifying the ethnic makeup. The aim of the resettlements and depopulation of the Kurdish population from villages to the cities were the Turkification of the Kurdish population or according to İsmail Beşikçi the destruction of the Kurdish nation.

Iraq

Shabaks

On 21 August 2006, Shabak Democratic Party leader Hunain Qaddo, proposed the creation of a separate province within the borders of the Nineveh Plain, arguing that the move was to combat the Arabization and Kurdification of Iraqi minorities. The Iraqi government voted against the proposition.

After 2011
Some Assyrians in the Kurdistan Region of Iraq complained that construction plans are "aimed at affecting a demographic change that divides Assyrian blocs". Also some Yazidis, Shabaks and Turkmens have reported that they are facing a policy of cultural and security control against them.

In 2016, David Romano, Professor of Middle East Politics, said that without the YPG and Peshmerga, the Assyrians of northern Syria and Iraq would likely all be dead, lying in some jihadist-dug mass grave.

During the Iraqi Civil War, Iraqi army troops fled their posts around the Nineveh Plains while ISIL attacked. Later, KRG forces, with the support of coalition airstrikes, captured these areas from ISIL. Since then, there have been disputes between pro-government Assyrians and Kurds, as the former have either asked the Kurds to leave or promised them autonomy.

In 2011, some Yazidi activists voiced their "concern over forced assimilation into Kurdish identity". Some have accused the Kurdish and Iraqi parties of diverting US $12 million of reconstruction funds allocated for Yazidi areas in Jebel Sinjar to a Kurdish village and marginalizing them politically. According to Sweden-based economist David Ghanim, the goal of some tactics of the KRG had been to push Shabak and Yazidi communities to identify as Kurds, which has been strongly denied by KRG authorities. He also claimed that the Kurdish authorities are working to impose Kurdish identity on the Yazidis and the Shabaks.

The Kurdish regional government has also been accused of trying to Kurdify other regions such as the Nineveh Plains and Kirkuk by providing financial support for Kurds who want to settle in those areas.

Kirkuk 
While Kurdish forces held the city of Kirkuk, Kurdish authorities attempted to Kurdify the city. Turkmen and Arab residents in Kirkuk experienced intimidation, harassment and were forced to leave their homes, in order to increase the Kurdish demographic in Kirkuk and bolster their claims to the city. Multiple Human Rights Watch reports detail the confiscation of Turkmen and Arab families' documents, preventing them from voting, buying property and travelling. Turkmen residents of Kirkuk were detained by Kurdish forces and compelled to leave the city. Kurdish authorities expelled hundreds of Arab families from the city, demolishing their homes in the process.

United Nations reports since 2006 have documented that Kurdish authorities and Peshmerga militia forces were illegally policing Kirkuk and other disputed areas, and that these militia have abducted Turkmen and Arabs, subjecting them to torture.

Iran

Küresunni Turks 
In the southwest of Khoy, there are Kurdicized groups of Küresünni Turks.

Syria

During the Syrian Civil War, the Syrian Democratic Forces, have been accused of Kurdification.  During 2016, Fabrice Balanche reported that the PYD was aiming to connect Kobane and Afrin cantons in the Manbij area between the Euphrates River and Afrin, where Kurds represent less than a quarter of the population, believing that various Kurdification methods could help subdue a large portion of the Turkmen and Arab population. Liz Sly of the Washington Post stated: Likewise, YPG is accused of Kurdifying the names of the villages, especially the Arab villages in Raqqa. World Council of Arameans has also accused PYD of Kurdifying the region and terrorizing the Christians.

More recently during the Syrian Civil War, many states, NGOs such as Human Rights Watch, and more than a dozen of Syrian rebel groups accused the Syrian Democratic Forces of Kurdifying traditional Arab and Turkmen lands. In 2015, Amnesty International disclosed allegations of unjustified forced displacement, demolition of homes, and the seizure and destruction of property of Arabs and Turkmens (including the destruction of entire villages in some cases) through a field research.

In a report published by the United Nations' Independent International Commission of Inquiry on the Syrian Arab Republic on 10 March 2017, the Commission refuted Amnesty International's reports of ethnic cleansing, stating that "'though allegations of 'ethnic cleansing' continued to be received during the period under review, the Commission found no evidence to substantiate reports that YPG or SDF forces ever targeted Arab communities on the basis of ethnicity." In interviews, YPG spokespersons acknowledged that a number of families were in fact displaced. However, they placed the number at no more than 25, and stated military necessity. They stated that the family members of terrorists maintained communications with them, and therefore had to be removed from areas where they might pose a danger. They further stated that IS was using civilians in those areas to plant car bombs or carry out other attacks on the YPG.

See also

Cultural assimilation
Minorities in Iraq
Kurdistan Regional Government
Shabak people

References

General references
A. Bazzaz, turkmen.nl "The Kurdification procedure was soon implemented by the Kurdish leadership after toppling Saddam down in April 2003"
Park, Bill, The Kurds and post-Saddam political arrangements in Iraq  The Adelphi Papers (2005),  Taylor & Francis: "The Kurds, who are intent on the further ‘Kurdification’ of Kirkuk before any census is held"
Park, Bill, Iraqi scenarios, The Adelphi Papers, Volume 45, Number 374, May 2005, pp. 49–66
PKK Iran - Strategic Comments, 2004 - informaworld.com "recent months Turkish intelligence has begun to report Turcoman frustration with Ankara’s failure to prevent the increasing ‘Kurdification’ of northern Iraq"

Cultural assimilation
Kurdish nationalism
Kurdistan Region (Iraq)
Political neologisms
Politics of Iraq